Murira is a village in the Commune of Gihanga in Bubanza Province in north western Burundi.

Notable residents
Eliane Becks Nininahazwe

References

External links
Satellite map at Maplandia.com

Populated places in Burundi
Bubanza Province